A Trip to Infinity is a 2022 documentary film directed by Jonathan Halperin and Drew Takahashi, in their feature length debut, which explores the concept of infinity through interviews with mathematicians, physicists and philosophers around the world.

Cast

References

External links
 
 
 

2022 documentary films
2022 directorial debut films